The Impeachment Union was a political party in Armenia.

History
Following the 2007 Armenian parliamentary elections, the party won no seats, winning a popular vote of just 1.29%. The union's leader was Nikol Pashinyan. The union's main goal was the impeachment of the then president Robert Kocharyan. The party officially dissolved in 2008, after the nomination of Levon Ter-Petrosyan as candidate in the Armenian presidential election and party members opted to merge with Levon Ter-Petrosyan's led Armenian National Congress party.

See also

 Civil Contract
 Programs of political parties in Armenia
 Politics of Armenia

References

2007 establishments in Armenia
2008 disestablishments in Armenia
Defunct political parties in Armenia
Impeachment
Political parties disestablished in 2008
Political parties established in 2007